Capoeta baliki, also known as the fourbarbel scraper or Sakarya barb, is a  species of cyprinid fish endemic to Turkey. It inhabits slowly flowing rivers, lakes and reservoirs.

It is known from central Anatolia from two river systems draining north to the Black Sea.  It was distinguished from Capoeta tinca (the Anatolian khramulya) as a separate species in 2006. This distinction has been considered doubtful however. The fish is found in many rivers and is often very abundant. It is used locally as a food fish.

"Balık" means fish in Turkish, and that's the source of the scientific name.

References 

baliki
Endemic fauna of Turkey
Fish described in 2006